This is a list of Ministers of Agriculture and Irrigation of Peru.

List of Ministers of Agriculture

References 

Agriculture in Peru
Agriculture ministers